John Nevin Sayre (February 4, 1884 – September 13, 1977) was an American Episcopal priest, peace activist, and author. He was an active member of the Fellowship of Reconciliation (FOR) and helped found the Episcopal Pacifist Fellowship (now the Episcopal Peace Fellowship). The US State Department official Francis Bowes Sayre Sr. was his brother.

Reputation
Sayre promoted peace and supported conscientious objectors throughout the world through magazines he edited (The World Tomorrow and Fellowship), books that he wrote, and various peace organizations he belonged to or founded.

Academics
Sayre taught nonviolent techniques at the Brookwood Labor College.

Hiss Case
Whittaker Chambers's wife Esther Shemitz and her friend Grace Lumpkin worked for Sayre on the staff of The World Tomorrow magazine during the 1920s.

Later, Sayre's brother Francis Bowes Sayre Sr. had Alger Hiss reporting to him at the State Department, then declined to testify on Hiss's behalf.

References

External links
Episcopal Church - John Nevin Sayre Award (1979)
Swarthmore College - John Nevin Sayre:  Records, 1885–1982; (bulk, 1922–1967)
Thomas Merton Center - Thomas Merton's Correspondence with: Sayre, John Nevin, 1885-1982
Pennsylvania Center for the Book - John Nevin Sayre
New York Times - Marriage Announcement (November 17, 1913)
FOR - 85 Years of the FOR
FOR - Noble Endeavor:  Memoir of FOR in the 20th Century
FOR - Living in an Extraordinary Time
FOR - Is War Good for Nonviolence?
Episcopal Peace Fellowship (EPF)
An Episcopal Dictionary of the Church

1884 births
1977 deaths
20th-century American Episcopal priests
Activists from Pennsylvania
American anti-war activists
American Christian pacifists
Anglican pacifists
Christians from Pennsylvania
Princeton University alumni
Religious leaders from Pennsylvania
Union Theological Seminary (New York City) alumni
Writers from Bethlehem, Pennsylvania